Yusuf Barnabas Bala (20 December 1956 – 11 July 2021) was a Nigerian politician, an architect, previous deputy governor of Kaduna State, Nigeria. He served as Kaduna state chairman of the ruling political party APC and was the founder of the architectural firm Bantex consortium. He died of a sudden illness on 11 July 2021.

References

Governors of Kaduna State
1956 births
2021 deaths
All Progressives Congress state governors of Nigeria
University of Lagos alumni